FNV may refer to:

 Federation of Dutch Trade Unions, a national trade union centre in the Netherlands
 Fowler–Noll–Vo hash function, a non-cryptographic hash function
 Furness Vale railway station (station code: FNV), on the Stockport, Disley and Whaley Bridge line in Derbyshire, England